Falcuna orientalis, the oriental marble, is a butterfly in the family Lycaenidae. It is found in the Democratic Republic of the Congo, Uganda, Kenya and Tanzania. The habitat consists of primary forests.

Subspecies
Falcuna orientalis orientalis (Uganda, western Kenya, north-western Tanzania)
Falcuna orientalis bwamba Stempffer & Bennett, 1963 (Uganda: Bwamba Valley, Democratic Republic of the Congo: east to Ituri, Kivu and Maniema)

References

Butterflies described in 1906
Poritiinae